Fuglesongen (The Bird Song) is an island in Albert I Land at Spitsbergen, Svalbard. It is named after its large number of birds, among which the little auk is particularly common.

References

Islands of Svalbard